The 2017 World Taekwondo Championships was the 23rd edition of the World Taekwondo Championships, and was held in Muju, South Korea from June 24 to June 30, 2017.

Medal table

Medal summary

Men

Women

Team ranking

Men

Women

Participating nations
A total of 945 athletes from 177 nations competed.

 (4)
 (5)
 (6)
 (2)
 (3)
 (3)
 (1)
 (16)
 (6)
 (12)
 (4)
 (1)
 (6)
 (9)
 (3)
 (3)
 (1)
 (5)
 (16)
 (1)
 (6)
 (1)
 (1)
 (5)
 (2)
 (16)
 (1)
 (6)
 (16)
 (16)
 (13)
 (1)
 (1)
 (6)
 (2)
 (12)
 (8)
 (1)
 (10)
 (3)
 (2)
 (2)
 (10)
 (2)
 (6)
 (13)
 (1)
 (3)
 (1)
 (2)
 (9)
 (4)
 (4)
 (2)
 (2)
 (14)
 (2)
 (14)
 (16)
 (2)
 (2)
 (3)
 (2)
 (5)
 (2)
 (7)
 (2)
 (3)
 (16)
 (4)
 (14)
 (1)
 (3)
 (7)
 (11)
 (16)
 (2)
 (11)
 (8)
 (16)
 (4)
 (1)
 (3)
 (2)
 (2)
 (3)
 (9)
 (2)
 (1)
 (3)
 (4)
 (3)
 (5)
 (4)
 (1)
 (4)
 (8)
 (1)
 (1)
 (1)
 (1)
 (16)
 (5)
 (5)
 (11)
 (2)
 (2)
 (10)
 (4)
 (1)
 (7)
 (2)
 (6)
 (8)
 (5)
 (1)
 (4)
 (1)
 (3)
 (1)
 (4)
 (7)
 (13)
 (11)
 (5)
 (6)
 (4)
 (3)
 (16)
 (4)
 (1)
 (1)
 (1)
 (1)
 (3)
 (2)
 (5)
 (9)
 (13)
 (1)
 (1)
 (2)
 (2)
 (6)
 (2)
 (16)
 (2)
 (16)
 (2)
 (7)
 (2)
 (3)
 (5)
 (1)
 (7)
 (1)
 (1)
 (8)
 (1)
 (5)
 (5)
 (8)
 (16)
 (6)
 (1)
 (7)
 (13)
 (1)
 (16)
 (2)
 (11)
 (1)
 (8)
 (7)
 (2)
 (1)
 (3)

References

Results (Archived version)

External links
Official website

 
International taekwondo competitions hosted by South Korea
World Taekwondo Championships
2017 in South Korean sport
2017 in taekwondo
Muju County
Taekwondo competitions in South Korea
June 2017 sports events in South Korea